Hiroden-honsha-mae is a Hiroden station (tram stop) on Hiroden Ujina Line located in front of Hiroden Head Office, in Senda-machi 3-chome, Naka-ku, Hiroshima. It's the terminal stop of route #7.

Routes
From Hiroden-honsha-mae Station, there are three of Hiroden Streetcar routes.

 Hiroshima Station - Hiroshima Port Route
 Hiroden-nishi-hiroshima - Hiroshima Port Route
 Yokogawa Station - Hiroden-honsha-mae Route

Connections

█ Ujina Line
 
Nisseki-byoin-mae — Hiroden-honsha-mae — Miyuki-bashi

Nisseki-byoin-mae — Hiroden-honsha-mae (terminal stop)

Other services connections

Hiroden Bus services routes
Route #12 at "Hiroden-ball-mae" bus stop

Hiroshima Bus services routes
Route #21-1 and #50 at "Hiroden-mae" bus stop

Around station
Hiroden Head Office
Hiroden Senda-shako
Hiroshima Naka-ku sports center
Ｈiroshima Prefectural Library

History
Opened as "Hatsudensho-mae" on November 23, 1912.
Renamed to "Dantetsu-mae" in 1927.
Renamed to the present name "Hiroden-honsha-mae", on March 16, 1958.

See also
Hiroden Streetcar Lines and Routes

References

Hiroden Ujina Line stations
Railway stations in Japan opened in 1912